Robert Lee "Matty" Mathews (August 6, 1887 – September 1, 1947) was an American football player and coach. He was the head football coach at St. Edward's College (1911), Kenyon College (1912–1914), Willamette University (1915–1920), the University of Idaho (1922–1925), Saint Louis University (1926–1927), Gonzaga University (1929), the University of Portland (1937–1942), and Lewis & Clark College (1945–1946).

Biography
He was born on August 6, 1887, in Leadville, Colorado.

Mathews played college football at Willamette University in Salem, Oregon, as a freshman then transferred to the University of Notre Dame in 1908 and played three seasons for the Fighting Irish in South Bend, Indiana. During his senior season in 1910, future coaching legend Knute Rockne was a freshman end.

In Mathews' four seasons at Idaho, the Vandals' first years in the Pacific Coast Conference, they won three consecutive rivalry games over Palouse neighbor Washington State. Idaho lost the other, Mathews' first in 1922, by a single point, and he remains the only Idaho head coach with multiple wins over WSU. The Vandals made significant use of the forward pass under Mathews, who was also the athletic director at Idaho.

He left Moscow and the Northwest after 1925 for St. Louis for two seasons (1926–27) but did not coach during the 1928 season, and worked in private business in Akron, Ohio, until hired at Gonzaga in June 1929. After less than a year in Spokane as athletic director and head coach in football and basketball, he resigned in April 1930 to pursue career options closer to the coast.

Mathews was also the head coach of the West Seattle Athletic Club in 1931 and 1932 and of the American Football League's Portland Rockets in 1944. In the 1930s, he supervised athletics for the Civilian Conservation Corps (CCC) camps in the state of Washington.

He returned to college football in Oregon at the University of Portland in 1937, where he was also athletic director. During World War II, the school dropped football prior to the 1943 season and Mathews resigned as AD the following spring when the administration extended the hiatus for the 1944 season. Entering his third season at Lewis & Clark in 1947,

Mathews died on September 1 at the age of 60 of a heart attack at his home in Portland, Oregon.

Head coaching record

College football

References

External links
 

1887 births
1947 deaths
Basketball coaches from Colorado
Gonzaga Bulldogs football coaches
Gonzaga Bulldogs men's basketball coaches
Idaho Vandals football coaches
Idaho Vandals athletic directors
Kenyon Lords football coaches
Lewis & Clark Pioneers football coaches
Lewis & Clark Pioneers men's basketball coaches
Notre Dame Fighting Irish football players
Portland Pilots athletic directors
Portland Pilots baseball coaches
Portland Pilots football coaches
Portland Pilots men's basketball coaches
Saint Louis Billikens football coaches
St. Edward's Crusaders football coaches
Washington Huskies baseball coaches
Washington Huskies football coaches
Washington Huskies football players
Willamette Bearcats football coaches
People from Leadville, Colorado
Sportspeople from Portland, Oregon
Players of American football from Colorado
Players of American football from Portland, Oregon
Willamette Bearcats football players
Willamette Bearcats athletic directors